SM UB-70 was a German Type UB III submarine or U-boat in the German Imperial Navy during World War I. She was commissioned into the German Imperial Navy on 29 October 1917 as SM UB-70.

UB-70 was serving in the Mediterranean when she departed on her last patrol on 16 April 1918. She was last heard from on 5 May 1918 when she reported herself to be in the Mediterranean Sea east of Gibraltar. She was never seen or heard from again. Her entire crew of 33 men was lost.

Construction

UB-70 was built by Friedrich Krupp Germaniawerft of Kiel and following just under a year of construction, launched at Kiel on 17 August 1917. UB-70 was commissioned later that same year under the command of Kptlt. Johannes Remy. Like all Type UB III submarines, UB-70 carried 10 torpedoes and was armed with a  deck gun. UB-70 had a displacement of  while surfaced and  when submerged. Her engines enabled her to travel at  when surfaced and  when submerged.

Summary of raiding history

References

Notes

Citations

Bibliography 

 

German Type UB III submarines
World War I submarines of Germany
U-boats commissioned in 1917
1917 ships
Ships built in Kiel
Maritime incidents in 1918
U-boats sunk in 1918
World War I shipwrecks in the Mediterranean Sea
Ships lost with all hands
Missing U-boats of World War I